Brennyville is an unincorporated community in Alberta Township, Benton County, Minnesota, United States.  The community is located near the junction of Benton County Roads 14 and 22.  Nearby places include Gilman and Foley.

References

Unincorporated communities in Benton County, Minnesota
Unincorporated communities in Minnesota